This is a list of mayors of Augusta, Georgia, United States, including the former city of Augusta and 1996–present consolidated Augusta–Richmond County.

Former city of Augusta

Consolidated Augusta–Richmond County

See also

 Timeline of Augusta, Georgia
Consolidated city–county

References

External links
Mayor's Office — AugustaGA.gov

Augusta, Georgia